Our Lady of Lebanon Cathedral may refer to:

Our Lady of Lebanon Cathedral, São Paulo, Brazil
Our Lady of Lebanon Procathedral, Bogotá, Colombia
 Our Lady of Lebanon Maronite Cathedral (Paris), France
 Our Lady of Valvanera Cathedral, Mexico City, seat of the Maronite Catholic Eparchy of Our Lady of the Martyrs of Lebanon in Mexico
 Our Lady of Lebanon Maronite Cathedral (Brooklyn), United States
 Our Lady of Mt. Lebanon-St. Peter Cathedral (Los Angeles), United States

See also 
For other churches named after Our Lady of Lebanon, see:
 Shrine of Our Lady of the Cedars, Johannesburg, South Africa
 Basilica and National Shrine of Our Lady of Lebanon (North Jackson, Ohio), United States
 Nuestra Señora del Líbano, Montevideo, Uruguay